The Technological Educational Institute of Thessaly or TEI of Thessaly (Technologikó Ekpaideutikó Idryma (T.E.I.) Thessalias; formerly Technological Educational Institute of Larissa, Τεχνολογικό Εκπαιδευτικό Ίδρυμα (Τ.Ε.Ι.) Λάρισας, Technologikó Ekpaideutikó Idryma (T.E.I.) Larissas, TEILAR) was a Greek public educational institute abolished in January 2019, law 4589, Government Gazette 13 Α'/29.01.2019.
Its former main campus and administrative centre was in Larissa, with satellite campuses in Trikala and Karditsa.

History 
The TEI of Thessaly was established as a tertiary education institution in 1983 (under Act 1404/83) along with all Greek Technological Educational Institutes. In 2001 (under Act 2916/2001) the TEI of Thessaly was established as a Higher Education institution, in compliance with the Bologna declaration, and abolished in 2019 (defunct) Law 4589/29.01.2019, its faculties absorbed by the University of Thessaly (UTH).

Schools and departments 
The "ATHENA" Reform Plan restructured Higher Education programmes in 2013.

The institute comprises four Schools, consisting of fifteen Departments.

The institution also offers several Master programmes.

Academic evaluation
In 2016 the external evaluation of the institution cited TEI of Thessaly as Worthy of merit.

An external evaluation of all academic departments in Greek universities was conducted by the Hellenic Quality Assurance and Accreditation Agency (HQA).

See also
 Fachhochschule (FH)
 List of universities in Greece
 List of research institutes in Greece
 University of Thessaly, a university located in the region of Thessaly, established in 1984.

References

External links
 Technological Educational Institute of Thessaly - Official website 
 Hellenic Quality Assurance and Accreditation Agency (HQA) 
 TEITHES Internal Quality Assurance Unit 
 "ATHENA" Plan for Higher Education 
 Greek Research and Technology Network (GRNET) 
 Hellenic Academic Libraries Link (HEAL-Link) 
 Okeanos (GRNET's cloud service) 

Larissa
Education in Thessaly
Educational institutions established in 1983
1983 establishments in Greece
Buildings and structures in Thessaly